Niagara Centre (formerly Welland) is a federal electoral district in the Niagara Region of Ontario that has been represented in the House of Commons of Canada from 1867 to 1988 and since 1997.

Demographics
According to the Canada 2021 Census

Ethnic groups: 83.0% White, 5.1% Indigenous, 3.1% Black, 2.5% South Asian, 1.3% Chinese, 1.2% Latin American, 1.0% Filipino 
Languages: 81.0% English, 4.5% French, 2.2% Italian, 1.1% Spanish
Religions: 60.5% Christian (32.7% Catholic, 5.3% Anglican, 3.5% United Church, 1.8% Presbyterian, 1.3% Baptist, 1.2% Lutheran, 1.1% Pentecostal, 13.6% Other), 2.1% Muslim, 35.2% None
Median income: $37,600 (2020)
Average income: $46,040 (2020)

Geography
Niagara Centre consists of the cities of Welland, Thorold, and Port Colborne, and the part of the City of St. Catharines lying south of a line drawn from the southern city limit north along First Louth St, east along St. Paul Street West, northeast along St. Paul Crescent, east and south along Twelve Mile Creek, and east along Glendale Avenue to the eastern city limit.

History

Welland was originally created in 1867 by the British North America Act.  It consisted initially of the Townships of Bertie, Crowland, Humberstone, Stamford, Thorold, and Willoughby, and the Villages of Chippawa, Clifton, Fort Erie, Thorold and Welland.

In 1892, the riding was redefined to exclude reference to the Village of Clifton, and include the villages of Niagara Falls and Port Colborne, and the town of Niagara Falls. In 1903, it was redefined to consist of the county of Welland.

In 1952, it was redefined to consist of the townships of Pelham, Thorold, Crowland, Humberstone and Wainfleet, including the city of Welland and the towns of Port Colborne, Thorold, Fonthill and Humberstone.

In 1966, it was redefined to consist of:
 in Welland County, the City of Welland and the Townships of Crowland, Humberstone and Wainfleet; and
 in Haldimand County, the Townships of Canborough, Dunn, Moulton and Sherbrooke.

In 1976, it was redefined to consist of the City of Welland, the Town of Thorold, and the part of the City of St. Catharines lying south of the Canadian National Railway.

The electoral district was abolished in 1987 when it was redistributed between Welland—St. Catharines—Thorold, St. Catharines and Erie ridings.

A new riding, named Niagara Centre was created in 1996 from parts of Erie and Welland—St. Catharines—Thorold ridings. It existed only for the 1997 and 2000 elections.

It consisted of the Town of Pelham, the City of Welland, the southern part of the City of St. Catharines,  and the part of the City of Thorold lying west of the Welland Canal.

The electoral district was abolished in 2003 when it was redistributed between Niagara West—Glanbrook, St. Catharines and Welland ridings.

In 2003, a new Welland riding was created from parts of Erie—Lincoln, Niagara Centre, Niagara Falls and St. Catharines ridings.

Welland was abolished in 2013, and was largely replaced by a new riding named Niagara Centre. The riding lost Wainfleet and the rural southwestern corner of St. Catharines.

Members of Parliament
This riding has elected the following Members of Parliament:

Election results

Niagara Centre, 2015–present

Welland, 2003–2015

Niagara Centre, 1996–2003

|}
Note:The 2000 Alliance vote is compared to the 1997 Reform vote

|}

Welland, 1867–1987

	

	

		
	

		

		

Note: NDP vote is compared to CCF vote in 1958 election.

	

					

				
Note: "National Government" vote is compared to Conservative vote in 1935 election. 		
	

	

	

Note: Conservative vote is compared to Government vote in 1917 election, and Liberal vote is compared to Opposition vote.

	

	

	

Note: popular vote is compared to redsult in 1891 general election.

See also 

 List of Canadian federal electoral districts
 Past Canadian electoral districts

References

1867-1987 Riding history from the Library of Parliament
2003-2008 Riding history from the Library of Parliament
 2011 results from Elections Canada
 Campaign expense data from Elections Canada

External links 

 Website of the Library of Parliament: Niagara Centre federal riding information

Ontario federal electoral districts
Politics of St. Catharines
Thorold
Welland
1867 establishments in Ontario
1987 disestablishments in Ontario
2013 establishments in Ontario